Kristina Pardalos (born 14 October 1973) is a San Marino judge born in New York City, United States of America and currently the judge of the European Court of Human Rights in respect of San Marino.

References

1973 births
Living people
Judges of the European Court of Human Rights
Sammarinese judges
American judges
American people of Sammarinese descent
Sammarinese judges of international courts and tribunals